The 1928 Summer Olympics saw the third field hockey tournament at Olympics. All games took place either in the new Olympisch Stadion or in the nearby Old Stadion. The field hockey tournament was held (together with football) in the first part of this Olympic games. All matches were played between Thursday, May 17 and Saturday, May 26, 1928.

The entry rules allowed one team from each country, with 22 players per team. The "Fédération Internationale de Hockey" defined the amateur status as follows: An amateur is one who has never obtained any profit by practicing the sport, neither directly or indirectly. If a player or an official accepts from club, association, or federation an amount exceeding what is strictly necessary for traveling and hotel expenses, such an amount will be regarded as profit.

Only a men's competition occurred that year, and nine nations competed:  Czechoslovakia withdrew before the draw.

Results

Divisions

Division A

Division B

Medal round

Bronze medal match

Gold medal match

Statistics

Final standings

Goalscorers

Medal summary

Note: The players above the line played at least one game in this tournament, the players below the line were probably only squad members. Nevertheless, the International Olympic Committee medal database exclusively credits them all as medalists. If or why they could have received medals is uncertain. However the National Olympic Committee of the Netherlands does not even show the Dutch players as competitors.

References

External links

International Olympic Committee medal database
Wudarski 

 
1928 Summer Olympics events
1928 in field hockey
1928 Summer Olympics